El Retorno is a town and municipality in the Guaviare Department, Colombia.

References

Municipalities of Guaviare Department